The 2020 BYU Cougars football team represented Brigham Young University in the 2020 NCAA Division I FBS football season. The Cougars were led by fifth-year head coach Kalani Sitake and played their home games at LaVell Edwards Stadium. This was the 10th year that BYU competed as an NCAA Division I FBS independent.

Before the season

Coaching changes
Running back coach A.J. Steward took a position on the University of Arizona coaching staff and was replaced by former BYU running back Harvey Unga.

2020 recruits

2019 returned missionaries

2020 other additions

2020 departures

Schedule
BYU‘s games against Michigan State, Minnesota, Utah, Arizona State, Stanford and Missouri were all canceled before the season started. These were moves by the Pac-12, Big Ten and SEC related to COVID-19 in order to
reduce the spread of the virus through travel restrictions. Any other changes to the schedule will be made in accordance with these restrictions. On August 8, 2020, the Mid-American Conference suspended their season taking Northern Illinois off of BYU's schedule. On August 10, 2020, Mountain West Conference suspended their 2020 season removing Utah State, Boise State and San Diego State from the Cougars’ 2020 schedule. The game at Army, scheduled for September 19 as part of the replacement slate of games, was postponed indefinitely on September 12 with both the academy and BYU pledging to attempt to reschedule the game for a later date.  Subsequently, the Mountain West Conference announced that both Boise State and San Diego State would be permitted to play BYU late in the season.

Rankings

NuSkin BYU Sports Network
The NuSkin BYU Sports Network is owned and operated by BYU Radio and features the talents of Greg Wrubell (play-by-play), Riley Nelson (analyst), Mitchell Juergens (reporter/sideline analyst), and Jason Shepherd (host) for the second consecutive year. The network is in charge of producing and broadcasting all BYU Football pre and post game shows as well as coaches shows and live broadcasts. The network also does the radio portion of BYU Football Media Day, but the 2020 Media Day was canceled due to COVID-19.

Affiliates

BYU Radio- Flagship Station Nationwide (Dish Network 980, Sirius XM 143, KBYU 89.1 FM HD 2, TuneIn radio, and byuradio.org)
KSL 102.7 FM and 1160 AM- (Salt Lake City / Provo, Utah and ksl.com)
KSNA- Blackfoot / Idaho Falls / Pocatello / Rexburg, Idaho (games)
KSPZ- Blackfoot / Idaho Falls / Pocatello / Rexburg, Idaho (coaches' shows)
KMXD- Monroe / Manti, Utah
KSVC- Richfield / Manti, Utah
KDXU- St. George, Utah

Personnel

Coaching staff

Roster

Depth chart

Game summaries

Navy

Sources:

Uniform combination: white helmets, white jersey, white pants w/ royal blue accents

Troy

Sources:

Uniform combination: white helmets, royal blue jersey, royal blue pants w/ white accents

Louisiana Tech

Sources:

Uniform combination: white helmets, royal blue jersey w/ white accents, white pants w/ royal blue accents

UTSA

Sources:

Uniform combination: white helmets, navy blue jersey w/ white accents, white pants w/ navy blue accents

Houston

Sources:

Uniform combination: white helmets, white jersey, royal blue pants w/ white accents

Texas State

Sources:

Uniform combination: white helmet, navy jersey w/ white trims and numbers, navy pants w/ white trims

Western Kentucky

Sources:

Uniform combination: white helmet, white jersey w/ navy trims and numbers, white pants w/ navy trims; pink gloves, socks, and long sleeves optional (Breast Cancer Survivor game)

Boise State

Sources:

Uniform combination: white helmets, white jersey, white pants w/ royal blue accents

North Alabama

Sources:

Uniform combination: white helmet (gray facemasks), navy jersey, white pants

Coastal Carolina

Sources:

Uniform combination: white helmets (grey facemasks), white jersey, white pants w/ royal blue accents

San Diego State

Sources:

Uniform combination: black helmets, black jersey w/ white numbers and royal blue stripes, black pants w/ royal blue accents

Boca Raton Bowl: UCF

Sources:

Uniform combination: white helmets, white jersey w/ royal blue numbers and royal blue stripes, white pants w/ royal blue accents

Players drafted into the NFL

References

BYU
BYU Cougars football seasons
Boca Raton Bowl champion seasons
BYU Cougars football